Ken Armstrong (born 12 October 1953) is a Canadian diver. He competed in two events at the 1976 Summer Olympics.

References

External links

1953 births
Living people
Canadian male divers
Olympic divers of Canada
Divers at the 1976 Summer Olympics
People from Ingersoll, Ontario
Sportspeople from Ontario
Commonwealth Games medallists in diving
Commonwealth Games silver medallists for Canada
Divers at the 1974 British Commonwealth Games
Divers at the 1978 Commonwealth Games
Medallists at the 1978 Commonwealth Games